Jung-Yul Kim (born February 9, 1973) is a former Canadian football offensive tackle who played six seasons in the Canadian Football League with the Calgary Stampeders and Toronto Argonauts. He was drafted by the Calgary Stampeders in the fifth round of the 1996 CFL Draft. Kim played CIS football at the University of Toronto. He won the 29th Vanier Cup with the Toronto Varsity Blues. He was also a member of the Calgary Stampeders team that won the 86th Grey Cup. Kim is also an actor, and serves as a police officer for the Toronto Police Service.

References

External links
Just Sports Stats
Jung-Yul Kim trading card
 

1973 births
Living people
20th-century Canadian male actors
20th-century South Korean male actors
21st-century Canadian male actors
21st-century South Korean male actors
Calgary Stampeders players
Canadian football offensive linemen
Canadian male actors of Korean descent
Canadian male film actors
Canadian male television actors
Canadian sportspeople of Korean descent
Male actors from Seoul
Male actors from Toronto
Players of Canadian football from Ontario
South Korean emigrants to Canada
South Korean male film actors
South Korean male television actors
South Korean players of Canadian football
Sportspeople from Seoul
Canadian football people from Toronto
Toronto Argonauts players
Toronto police officers
Toronto Varsity Blues football players